Cornel Lupău (born 2 October 1957 – 15 June 2014) was a Romanian professional footballer. Lupău grew up at Minerul Baia Mare, team for which he made his senior debut, at the level of Divizia B. In 1976, Cornel moved to Bihor Oradea and made its debut in the top-flight, level at which he played in 100 matches, also scoring 8 goals. In 1983 he moved to UTA Arad, then played and coached for various teams at amateur level.

In 1976, Cornel Lupău was also a member of the Romanian Olympic football team.

After retirement he was for many years a football coach in the youth academy of Bihor Oradea.

Honours
Bihor Oradea
Divizia B: 1981–82

References

1957 births
2014 deaths
People from Bihor County
Romanian footballers
Association football midfielders
Liga I players
Liga II players
CS Minaur Baia Mare (football) players
FC Bihor Oradea players
FC UTA Arad players